Dominique Michel, OC, CQ (born Aimée Sylvestre; September 24, 1932 in Sorel-Tracy, Quebec) is a Quebec comedian, actress, singer and artist.

Biography 
She began her career in cabarets performing songs written by Raymond Lévesque and subsequently sang with Jean Coutu. She made her television debut co-hosting a variety show then widened her audience with her first sitcom Moi et l'autre in which she co-starred with Denise Filiatrault.  The show was an enormous success during its run from 1966 to 1972 and made Michel a household name in Quebec.

She has been married only once in 1958 to New York Rangers all star Camille Henry but later divorced in 1960.

From 1977 to 1982, she had numerous leading roles in television programs such as Dominique, Chère Isabelle and Métro-boulot-dodo.

Michel's first film role was in Tiens-toi bien après les oreilles à papa with Yvon Deschamps in 1971. She played for cineast Denys Arcand in two movies well known outside of Quebec: The Decline of the American Empire (Le Déclin de l'empire américain) and its sequel The Barbarian Invasions (Les Invasions barbares).

She is also a comedian. She notably co-starred with Daniel Lemire and has hosted the Festival Juste pour rire multiple times. Michel also showed her multiple comedic talents in the year-end review show Bye Bye from Radio-Canada in which she would do multiple impressions on top of hosting the 90 minutes special.

In 1992, Michel received the Governor General's Performing Arts Award for Lifetime Artistic Achievement in broadcasting. In 1994, she was made an Officer of the Order of Canada "for her encouragement of humour and her contribution to the cultural life of the country." In 2002, she was made a Knight of the National Order of Quebec. In 1995, she received, jointly with Denise Filiatrault, the Grand Prix Gémeau from l'Académie canadienne du cinéma et de la télévision for lifetime achievements.

In 2010, at 77, it was announced that she had colon cancer. After undergoing chemotherapy treatments, she declared in April 2011 that she was cancer-free.

Selected filmography

Movies
Hold on to Daddy's Ears (Tiens-toi bien après les oreilles à papa) - 1971
Enuff Is Enuff (J'ai mon voyage!) - 1973
There's Always a Way to Find a Way (Y'a toujours moyen de moyenner!) - 1973
Les aventures d'une jeune veuve - 1974
Far from You Sweetheart (Je suis loin de toi mignonne) - 1976
The Crime of Ovide Plouffe (Le Crime d'Ovide Plouffe) - 1984
The Decline of the American Empire (Le Déclin de l'empire américain) - 1986
Night Zoo (Un zoo la nuit) - 1987
Louis 19, King of the Airwaves (Louis 19, le roi des ondes) - 1994
Laura Cadieux II (Laura Cadieux...la suite) - 1999
The Barbarian Invasions (Les Invasions barbares) - 2003

Television
Moi et l'autre (from 1966 to 1972)
Dominique (from 1977 to 1979)
Chère Isabelle (1976)
Métro-boulot-dodo (1982)
The Mills of Power (Les Tisserands du pouvoir) - 1988
Montréal, ville ouverte (1992)
Catherine (from 1999 to 2003)
Virginie (from 2004 to 2005)

References

1932 births
Actresses from Quebec
Canadian film actresses
Canadian television actresses
Canadian women comedians
French Quebecers
Knights of the National Order of Quebec
Living people
Officers of the Order of Canada
People from Sorel-Tracy
Comedians from Quebec
Governor General's Performing Arts Award winners
French-language singers of Canada
Canadian women singers